Senecio invalidus is a species of the genus Senecio and family Asteraceae.

References

External links

invalidus
Plants described in 1992